Fletcherella niphadarcha is a moth of the family Pterophoridae. It is known from Cameroon, the Democratic Republic of Congo and Uganda.

References

Platyptiliini
Insects of Cameroon
Insects of the Democratic Republic of the Congo
Insects of Uganda
Moths of Africa
Moths described in 1930